Moonlighter is an action RPG indie game developed by Spanish indie studio Digital Sun and released for Microsoft Windows, macOS, Linux, PlayStation 4, and Xbox One on May 29, 2018. A Nintendo Switch version was released on November 5, 2018. The game was made available for iOS and Android in November 2020 and September 2021, but were subsequently delisted. The mobile version was re-released for iOS and Android on May 24, 2022, via Netflix.  A Stadia version developed by 11-bit studios in partnership with Crunching Koalas was released on July 1, 2021. A DLC expansion, subtitled Between Dimensions, was released on July 23, 2019.

Gameplay 
Moonlighter has the player manage their shop during the day and go exploring at night. Shop keeping involves managing goods and receiving money, which the player can invest to upgrade the town and add services like a potion-maker and a blacksmith. These town upgrades allow the player to craft weapons, armor, and health potions, hire a part-time worker to sell things during the day, as well as upgrade the characters' equipment. At night, the player can explore dungeons and confront hordes of enemies, which drop loot upon defeat; loot can also be found in chests once the player clears a room. The game is divided by four different dungeons, the Golem, Forest, Desert, and Tech dungeons.

Reception 

Moonlighter received "generally favorable" reviews according to review aggregator Metacritic. It was nominated for "Fan Favorite Indie Game" and "Fan Favorite Role Playing Game" at the Gamers' Choice Awards, and for "Most Fulfilling Community-Funded Game" at the SXSW Gaming Awards.

References

External links 

2018 video games
Action role-playing video games
Indie video games
IOS games
Linux games
MacOS games
Nintendo Switch games
PlayStation 4 games
Single-player video games
Video games developed in Spain
Windows games
Xbox Cloud Gaming games
Xbox One games
11 bit studios games